John Robinson (born 1983) is an English organist and choral conductor. Currently, he is the Director of Music at Blackburn Cathedral. Robinson is active as an Organ Recitalist, having performed in venues across the US and Europe, and recorded on the organ for Priory, Herald, Hyperion, Regent and Ambisonic. He has led choral festivals for various organisations including the RSCM and Pueri Cantores. His choral recordings include releases on Decca Records and Sony Classical

Education and early career
Robinson was a chorister and Organ student of Roy Massey at Hereford Cathedral then Organ Scholar at Canterbury Cathedral working with David Flood. He became the Organ Scholar at St John's College, Cambridge with Christopher Robinson and David Hill. At University of Cambridge he won the Brian Runnett Prize for Organ, and the Plymouth National Young Organists' Competition. He became Fellow of The Royal College of Organists and graduated from Cambridge University with a degree in Music.

Career

Carlisle Cathedral
From 2005, Robinson was Assistant Organist at Carlisle Cathedral where he made several organ recordings for Priory Records including the Complete Organ Works of Samuel Sebastian Wesley and a recording of Romantic English Organ Music. He was the Director of Carlisle Cathedral Youth Choir, and of Cockermouth Harmonic Society.

Canterbury Cathedral
In 2008, he became Assistant Organist at Canterbury Cathedral and organist of The King's School, Canterbury. He made a solo DVD of Canterbury Cathedral Organ with Priory Records, hailed as 'Recording of the Month' by Music Web International, as well as recordings with the Cathedral Choir and Choir of The King's School, Canterbury.

St. Paul's Choir School
In 2010, Robinson was appointed Organist and Director of Music at St. Paul's Choir School, in Harvard Square. There he was responsible for training the Choir of Men and Boys in daily sung liturgies, concerts, tours and recordings. Having professionalised the men of the choir, Robinson significantly widened the liturgical repertoire of the Choir. He oversaw collaborations with other choirs and orchestras, which raised the profile of the Choir both nationally and internationally. He led their first internationally released recording 'Christmas in Harvard Square'. Released with Decca Records the recording remained high on the Classical Billboard Charts for months after its release. Robinson acted as an advisor to various Church Music appointments, and appeared as an organist across the US. Under his direction the Choir released a second Internationally-acclaimed album, 'Ave Maria' with Sony Classical. Robinson renewed the Choir's relationship with the Boston Symphony Orchestra

Blackburn Cathedral
In 2019 Robinson became Organist and Director of Music at Blackburn Cathedral. His first solo Organ recording was Editor's Choice in the 2022 Awards Edition of Gramophone Magazine  and gained wide critical acclaim. He has directed the Cathedral Choirs live on BBC1 on Christmas Eve and Christmas Day 2022 and on BBC Radio 3.

References

1983 births
Living people
Cathedral organists
Music directors
English classical organists
English choral conductors
British male organists
British male conductors (music)
British music educators
British expatriates in the United States
21st-century British conductors (music)
21st-century organists
21st-century British male musicians
Alumni of St John's College, Cambridge
Male classical organists